Fire on the Mountain is the fifth studio album by Charlie Daniels and the second as the Charlie Daniels Band, released in 1974, appearing on the record label Kama Sutra Records, then later in 1976 by Epic Records. Most of the tracks on the album are studio recordings, while the last two songs are live performances, recorded at the War Memorial Auditorium, Nashville, Tennessee on October 4, 1974. This album was certified Platinum by the RIAA on January 22, 1992.

Early pressings of the album contained a bonus three song, seven inch, 45 RPM disc. Side one was "Volunteer Jam Part (1)" and side two was "Volunteer Jam contd. Part (2)" and "Volunteer Jam contd. Part (3)". The catalogue number of this disc is KSBS-EP-10.

Track listing
All songs composed by the bandleader, Charlie Daniels,  except where indicated:

Side one
 "Caballo Diablo" - 4:28
 "Long Haired Country Boy" - 4:03
 "Trudy" - 4:51
 "Georgia" - 3:06
 "Feeling Free" (Barry Barnes) - 4:10

Side two
 "The South's Gonna Do It" - 4:00
 "New York City, King Size Rosewood Bed" - 3:26
 "No Place to Go" (Live) - 11:24
 "Orange Blossom Special" (Live Instrumental) (Ervin T. Rouse) - 3:00

Personnel
Band members:

Charlie Daniels – electric, slide and acoustic guitars, banjo, fiddle, lead vocals
Joel "Taz" DiGregorio – keyboards, vocals
Barry Barnes – electric and acoustic guitars, vocals
Mark Fitzgerald – Bass guitar
Gary Allen – drums, percussion
Fred Edwards –  drums

Additional musicians:
Richard Betts – dobro on "Long Haired Country Boy"
Jaimie Nichol – Congas on "New York City, King Size Rosewood Bed", "No Place To Go" and "Feeling Free"

Additional personnel:
Paul Hornsby – Production
Roslav Szaybo and Simon Cantwell – Design
James Flournoy Holmes and Kent Griggs – cover art and photography
Ovie Sparks – engineer
Tony Humphreys – assistant engineer

Certifications

References

1975 albums
Charlie Daniels albums
Kama Sutra Records albums
Epic Records albums
Albums produced by Paul Hornsby
Albums with cover art by James Flournoy Holmes